An Afghan rug (or Afghan carpet) is a type of handwoven floor-covering textile traditionally made in the northern and western areas of Afghanistan, mainly by Afghan Turkmens and Uzbeks.

Types and varieties 

One of the most exotic and distinctive of all oriental rugs is the Shindand or Adraskan (named after local Afghan towns), woven in the Herat Province, in western Afghanistan. Strangely elongated human and animal figures are their signature look. The carpet can be sold across Afghanistan with the most based in Mazar-e Sharif. 

Another staple of Afghanistan is Baluchi rugs, most notably Baluchi prayer rugs. They are made by Afghanistan's Baloch people in the south-western part of the country.

Various vegetable and other natural dyes are used to produce the rich colors. The rugs are mostly of medium sizes. Many patterns and colors are used, but the traditional and most typical is that of the octagonal elephant's foot (Bukhara) print, often with a red background. The weavers also produce other trappings of the nomadic lifestyle, including tent bags and ceremonial pieces.

Production 
In 2021 Afghanistan exported 800,000 square meters of Afghan rug, which generated about $30 million dollars. In 2008, 2013, and 2014 Afghan rugs won international awards at an international exhibition held every year in Hamburg, Germany. It was reported that around 2 million Afghans are involved in the rug business in Afghanistan.

Some Afghan rugs are woven by Afghan refugees who reside on a temporary basis in Pakistan and Iran. It has been reported that the majority of Afghan rugs during the war period were sent to Pakistan to be exported, where they were given the label "Made in Pakistan" when they were made in Afghanistan.

See also 
Culture of Afghanistan
Economy of Afghanistan
War rugs
Pakistani rug

References

External links 
 Afghan Rug Pop Up Brings Awareness—and Rugs—to the U.S. (Andrea Lillo, November 4, 2019)
 For Kabul’s carpet, antique dealers, a long wait for buyers (Al Jazeera, September 28, 2021)